The British post offices in Africa were a system of post offices set up by the United Kingdom to be used by its Middle East Forces and East Africa Forces in Africa during and after World War II.

Middle East Forces 
Definitive British stamps were overprinted "M.E.F." beginning in 1942. They were available in  Cyrenaica, Eritrea, Ethiopia, and Somalia, Tripolitania as well as in the Dodecanese islands in the Aegean. At the beginning of 1943, the color-changed definitives were also overprinted, and in 1947, the 5-shilling and 10-shilling stamps received the overprint. In 1950, the British government declared that the remaining overprinted stamps were valid for postage throughout the UK, and so many of the surviving stamps have British inland rather than foreign postmarks.

East Africa Forces 
The East Africa Forces in Italian Somalia also received British stamps, but overprinted "E.A.F." instead, beginning 15 January 1943.

Eritrea, Somalia and Tripolitania 
From 1948 on, the military administrations in Eritrea, Somalia, and Tripolitania used their own overprints.

See also 
Postage stamps and postal history of Eritrea
Postage stamps and postal history of Libya
Postage stamps and postal history of Somalia

Sources 
 Stanley Gibbons Ltd: various catalogues
 AskPhil – Glossary of Stamp Collecting Terms
 Encyclopaedia of Postal History
 Stuart Rossiter & John Flower: The Stamp Atlas
 Scott catalogue

Further reading
 Sirotti, Luigi and Nuccio Taroni. Le Occupazioni Britanniche Delle Colonie Italiane 1941-1950: storia postale = Postal History of the British Occupation of Italian Colonies 1941-1950. Rome: Sassone S.R.L., 2006 363p.
 Tregurtha, Alan R. British Occupation of Former Italian Colonies. Bridgwater: The G.B. Overprint Society, 1987/8. 

Africa
Military mail
Africa in World War II
British colonisation in Africa